Patrick Hoberg (born September 11, 1986) is an American Major League Baseball (MLB) umpire.

A native of Des Moines, Iowa, Hoberg graduated from Urbandale High School and Grand View University.

Hoberg made his Major League debut in 2014, and was one of four umpires promoted to the full-time staff in February 2017, upon the retirements of Bob Davidson, John Hirschbeck, Jim Joyce, and Tim Welke.

For the 2018 regular season he was found to be a Top 10 performing home plate umpire in terms of accuracy in calling balls and strikes. His error rate was 7.93 percent. This was based on a study conducted at Boston University where 372,442 pitches were culled and analyzed.

On October 29, 2022, during Game 2 of the 2022 World Series, Hoberg called a "perfect game" with 129 of 129 taken pitches called correctly. Hoberg received widespread praise from both fans and commentators of baseball.

References

External links
Retrosheet
The Baseball Cube
BR Bullpen

1986 births
Living people
Major League Baseball umpires
Sportspeople from Des Moines, Iowa
Grand View University alumni